is a sacred bronze mirror that is part of the Imperial Regalia of Japan.

Name and significance 
The  represents "wisdom" or "honesty," depending on the source. Its name literally means "The Eight  Mirror," a reference to its size. Mirrors in ancient Japan represented truth because they merely reflected what was shown, and were objects of mystique and reverence (being uncommon items).

According to Shinsuke Takenaka at the Institute of Moralogy,  is considered the most precious of the three sacred treasures.

History 
In the year 1040 ( 1, 9th month), the compartment which contained the Sacred Mirror was burned in a fire. Whether that mirror was irrevocably lost or not, it is said to be housed today in Ise Grand Shrine, in Mie Prefecture, Japan, although a lack of public access makes this difficult to verify. Presently, a replica is enshrined in Three Palace Sanctuaries of the Imperial Palace in Tokyo.

Mythology 
They were given to Amaterasu's grandson, Ninigi-no-Mikoto, when he went to pacify Japan along with the sword . From there, the treasures passed into the hands of the Imperial House of Japan.

The researcher Shinsuke Takenaka said according to the legends, Amaterasu told Ninigi: "Serve this mirror as my soul, just as you'd serve me, with clean mind and body."

See also

References

External links 
 Ise Jingu's page on the Yata no Kagami

Japanese mythology
Japanese words and phrases
Mirrors
Tourist attractions in Mie Prefecture
Buildings and structures in Mie Prefecture
Ise Grand Shrine